Chore may refer to one of the following:

House work
Housekeeping
Handyman work (odd jobs)
Biochore, parts of the biosphere with similar environmental conditions 
Chore (band), a Canadian rock band
Édgar Mejía (El Chore, born 1988), Mexican footballer

See also
Choré (disambiguation)
Choron (disambiguation)
Chorion, a fetal membrane